Dexter is a surname and masculine given name of English origin. Notable people with the name include:

Surname
Al Dexter (1905–1984), American country musician and songwriter
Andrew Dexter Jr. (1779–1837), American financier and speculator
Barrie Dexter (born 1921), Australian former senior diplomat and public servant
Brad Dexter (1917–2002), Serbian-American actor
Brad Dexter (ice hockey) (born 1972), Canadian ice hockey defenceman 
Caroline Dexter (1819–1884), English-Australian writer and feminist
Charles O. Dexter (1862–1943), American rhododendron hybridizer
Colin Dexter, OBE (1930–2017), English crime writer
Darrell Dexter (born 1957), Canadian politician
Elliott Dexter (1870–1941), American film and stage actor
Felix Dexter (1961–2013), British actor, comedian, and writer
George E. Dexter (1823–1894), American politician in Wisconsin and Minnesota
Glen Dexter (born 1952), Canadian sailor
Gregory Dexter, Baptist minister and colonial president of the colony of Rhode Island (Providence and Warwick only)
Harry Dexter (1910–1973), English composer and arranger
Henry Martyn Dexter (1821–1890), American clergyman and author
Iris Dexter (1907 - 1974), Australian journalist and war correspondent
James Dexter (born 1973), American football offensive tackle
Jeff Dexter (born 1946), British disc jockey, club promoter, record producer and dancer
Jerry Dexter (1935–2013), American voice actor
Kristen Dexter (born 1961), American politician from Wisconsin
Mark Dexter (born 1973), English actor
Maury Dexter (born 1928), American producer and director
Maxine Dexter (born 1972), American politician
Michael Dexter (born 1945), British haematologist
Nancy Dexter (1923–1983), Australian journalist
Neil Dexter (born 1984), South African-born English cricketer
Pete Dexter (born 1943), American novelist
Sally Dexter (born 1960), English actress of stage and screen
Samuel Dexter (1761–1816), American politician, U.S. Secretary of the Treasury
Simon Newton Dexter (1785–1862), New York merchant and politician
Steven Dexter (born 1962), South African theatre director and writer
Ted Dexter (1935-2021), Sussex and English test cricketer
Terry Dexter (born 1978), American contemporary R&B singer-songwriter, actress and multi-instrumentalist
Timothy Dexter (1748–1806), American businessman noted for his writing and eccentricity
Walter Dexter (disambiguation), multiple people
Walter L. Dexter (1841–1920), American politician and farmer

Given name
Dexter Allen (born 1970), American blues musician
Dexter Bean (born 1987), American racing driver
Dexter Blackstock (born 1986), English football player
Dexter Brown (born 1942), British painter
Dexter Canipe (born 1960), American racing driver
Dexter Carter (born 1967), American football player and coach
Dexter Coakley (born 1972), American football player
Dexter Edgar Converse (1829–1899), American businessman and philanthropist
Dexter Curtis (1828–1898), American inventor and politician
Dexter Dalwood (born 1960), British painter
Dexter Daniels (Aboriginal activist) (1938–c.1990), Aboriginal Australian activist
Dexter Daniels (American football) (born 1973), American football player
Dexter Darden (born 1991), American actor
Dexter Davis (born 1986), American football player
Dexter Davis Jr. (born 1990), American football player
Dexter Doria, Filipino actress
Dexter W. Draper (1881–1961), American football player and coach
Dexter Dunphy (born 1934), Australian academic
Dexter Edge (born 1953), American musicologist
Dexter Fahey (born 1989), South African rugby union player
Dexter Faulk (born 1984), American track and field athlete
Dexter M. Ferry (1833–1907), American businessman
Dexter M. Ferry Jr. (1873–1959), American politician 
Dexter Filkins (born 1961), American war correspondent
Dexter Fitton (born 1965), English cricketer
Dexter Fletcher (born 1966), British actor
Dexter Fowler (born 1986), American baseball player
Dexter Goei (born 1971), American business executive
Dexter Gordon (1923–1990), American jazz tenor saxophonist
Dexter Grimsley (born 1970), American politician
Dexter Gore Jr (born 1993), American rapper and songwriter
Dexter Holland (born 1965), American punk rock singer and musician
Dexter Hope (born 1993), Dutch basketball player
Dexter Horton (1825–1904), American banker
Dexter Jackson (disambiguation), multiple people
Dexter Janke (born 1992), Canadian football player and coach
Dexter Keezer (1895–1991), American economist and college administrator
Dexter Kernich-Drew (born 1991), Australian basketball player
Dexter King (born 1961), American civil rights activist
Dexter Kozen (born 1951), American computer scientist
Dexter Lawrence (born 1997), American football player
Dexter Lumis (born 1984), WWE wrestling superstar
Dexter Manley (born 1959), American football player
Dexter McDougle (born 1991), American football player
Dexter Roberts (born 1991), American country music singer
Dexter Simmons (born 1983), American fashion designer
Dexter Tortoriello (born 1986), American singer-songwriter and record producer
Dexter Vines, American comic book artist and inker
Dexter Williams (born 1997), American football player

Fictional characters

 Dexter, also known as Dex-Starr, a member of the Red Lantern Corps in the DC Universe
 Dexter Dexter, the title character from Dexter's Laboratory
 Dexter, a monkey from the Night at the Museum film series, played by Crystal the Monkey
 Dexter, young version of the protagonist in the Space Ace video game
 Dexter "Dex" Barrington, a character in The Country Bears
 Ramone "Ray" Dexter, one half of the gunshark duo Sinister Dexter in the British comics anthology 2000 AD
 Dexter Douglas, the alter ego of the title character in Freakazoid!
 Dexter Hartman, a character from EastEnders
 Dexter Jettster, proprietor of Dex's Diner and criminal informant in Star Wars: Episode II – Attack of the Clones
 Dexter Morgan, a fictional serial killer/vigilante and blood spatter analyst created by writer Jeff Lindsay
 Dexter Mulholland, a character from EastEnders
 Dexter Walker, a character in the Australian soap opera Home and Away
 Charles Dexter Ward, the protagonist of the cosmic horror novel The Case of Charles Dexter Ward by H. P. Lovecraft
 Dexter Vex, a character from the Skulduggery Pleasant series by Derek Landy

See also
 Dex (disambiguation)

Masculine given names
English masculine given names